Till Kahrs is a recording artist, singer-songwriter, trainer, speaker, author, and business communication skills expert.

His early life
Kahrs was born in Hamburg, Germany. He is the only son of two German-born parents. When he was one year old, his parents emigrated to the United States, where his father became a professor of political science.

Till Kahrs graduated from El Dorado High School (Placentia, California) and subsequently attended University of California, Irvine where he received his BA Degree in Social Science. He later received a Master's Degree of Business Administration from Pepperdine University. Kahrs has held various positions in sales and marketing for three Fortune 500 Companies in the beverage alcohol industry including Gallo Wine Company, Seagrams, and Heublein before pursuing his musical and speaking/training career. Till became the youngest District Manager ever at the Gallo Wine Company at age 22, and the youngest Regional Manager in history at Seagrams at age 25. He resides in Southern California.

Musical career
Kahrs started playing the Orange County coffee house circuit in the early nineties playing cover songs as well as his own self-penned compositions. His constant playing and huge following provided him the opportunity to headline The Crazy Horse Saloon, in Santa Ana, California which he sold out twice in the mid-nineties. The Los Angeles Times called him "the master of hooks" and mentioned further "his greatest asset is his winning baritone", after reviewing one of his shows. This led to his being signed to a six album record deal by Autogram Records.

In 1994 Till Kahrs had a Top Ten Country hit in Europe called, "Playin’ For Keeps", followed by another Country Top Ten hit titled, "Slow Burn Woman" in 1995.

Till has also been the lead singer and lyricist for the musical group Blue Moon, signed by Marabu Records.

In September 2017 Till's song "The Lights of Hamburg" hit the charts and a 'live' interview was conducted in German on the world's oldest radio station NDR in his hometown of Hamburg.

After music
After several years of touring in Europe Kahrs returned to his business roots doing training and speaking, as an expert in public speaking and selling skills. In 2000 his book Enhancing Your Presentation Skills was published and that same year he also founded his own training company TheTrainer4u.com. Kahrs' book has become an international business best seller and is now also available as an eBook. 
Till Kahrs, who is also known as "The Speak Dr.", is solely credited for developing the "Lock, Talk, and Pause" and "Absorb, Align, and Address" concepts which are at the core of his public speaking skills technology which helps people to control their eye contact and slow down their speech delivery, thereby managing their nervous behavior.
He is often contacted by national magazines and asked about people's fear of public speaking. In July 2006 an article appeared in Fitness Magazine and MSN: Get-A-Grip Guide to Conquering Your Phobias and Kahrs explained the secrets of maintaining composure during public speaking.

Kahrs has been featured in articles by the Orange County Register, The John Tesh Radio Program, Irvine World News MSN and USA Today. He is also a frequent guest on TV and radio programs analyzing Presidential Debates and offering advice to listeners on public speaking.

On 1-12-15 Till Kahrs appeared on The KTLA Morning Show in LA, and on 3-20-14 Kahrs appeared on The Fox Business News Channel-The Willis Report with Host Gerri Willis in NY.

In 2009 Till Kahrs released the DVD "Presentation Skills Mastery", which is now the No. 1 Selling Speaking DVD on AMAZON.

Discography
Playin' For Keeps

Bibliography
Aktuelle US-Verkaufspraktiken (1987), Freiburg im Breisgau, Haufe  
Enhancing Your Presentation Skills (September 2000), iUniverse (self),

References

External links
Kahrs at OttoBib.com
http://www.ocregister.com/ocr/sections/business/business/article_582005.php
http://www.ocregister.com/ocregister/money/article_1623667.php

German emigrants to the United States
Living people
University of California, Irvine alumni
Pepperdine University alumni
Musicians from Hamburg
Year of birth missing (living people)